Anthony Hemmings (born 21 September 1967) is an English former professional footballer who played as a midfielder.

Hemmings spent the bulk of his playing career outside the Football League, with only Wycombe Wanderers, Chester City (who were relegated to the Football Conference after his half-season there in 1999–2000) and Carlisle United enjoying his presence in league circles – the latter two coming after being signed by Ian Atkins.

While with Macclesfield Town in 1996, Hemmings scored at Wembley Stadium when the Silkmen beat Cheshire rivals Northwich Victoria in the FA Trophy final.

He managed Stapenhill before joining Ashby Ivanhoe as manager in May 2013. He left the club in April 2015, and subsequently managed Kimberley Miners Welfare between September 2015 and February 2016.

He is the father of current footballer Kane Hemmings.

References

External links

Tony Hemmings career stats at GresleyRovers.com

1967 births
Living people
Sportspeople from Burton upon Trent
English footballers
Association football midfielders
English Football League players
National League (English football) players
Rocester F.C. players
Northwich Victoria F.C. players
Wycombe Wanderers F.C. players
Macclesfield Town F.C. players
Hednesford Town F.C. players
Gloucester City A.F.C. players
Altrincham F.C. players
Ilkeston Town F.C. (1945) players
Chester City F.C. players
Carlisle United F.C. players
Tamworth F.C. players
Alfreton Town F.C. players
Gresley F.C. players
English football managers
Stapenhill F.C. managers
Ashby Ivanhoe F.C. managers
Kimberley Miners Welfare F.C. managers